Flight of the Conchords is a musical comedy duo from New Zealand. It's also the title of three of the duo's works:
 Flight of the Conchords (album), their debut album
 Flight of the Conchords (radio series), their BBC radio series
 Flight of the Conchords (TV series), their HBO television series